Salix waldsteiniana, the Waldstein willow, is a species of willow native to Europe.

Description
Flowering takes place in May-June. The shrub has a size of 30 to 150 cm. In the fall, its golden foliage makes it very decorative.

Salix waldsteiniana grows in Italy, Austria, Germany, Switzerland, the Balkan peninsula, the Alps (1,500 to 2,500 m above sea level) and the Greater Balkans.

Synonymy
Salix arbuscula var. waldsteiniana (Willd.) K.Koch
Salix prunifolia Sm.

Bibliography
Hassler M. (2016). World Plants: Synonymic Checklists of the Vascular Plants of the World (version Nov 2015). In: Species 2000 & ITIS Catalog of Life, 2016 Annual Checklist (Roskov Y., Abucay L., Orrell T., Nicolson D., Flann C., Bailly N., Kirk P., Bourgoin T., DeWalt RE, Decock W., De Wever A., eds). Digital resource at www.catalogueoflife.org/annual-checklist/2016. Species 2000: Naturalis, Leiden, the Netherlands. ISSN 2405-884X.
Botanische Jahrbücher für Systematik, Pflanzengeschichte und Pflanzengeographie, Adolf Engler (1844-1930), newspaper, publication info, Stuttgart: Schweizerbart, [1881] -2009.
Walter Erhardt, Erich Götz, Nils Bödeker, Siegmund Seybold: Der große Zander. Eugen Ulmer KG, Stuttgart 2008, . (g.)
Christoper Brickell (Editor-in-chief): RHS AZ Encyclopedia of Garden Plants. Third edition. Dorling Kindersley, London 2003, . (Eng.)

References

waldsteiniana
Plants described in 1806
Taxa named by Carl Ludwig Willdenow